Magnus Kirt (born 10 April 1990) is an Estonian athlete who competes in the javelin throw. He won the silver medal at the 2019 World Championships. His personal best of 90.61 m is the Estonian record.

Career
He competed at the 2015 World Championships in Beijing without qualifying for the final.

On 3 June 2018 he broke former world champion Andrus Värnik's long-standing national record with 88.45 m at the 54th Gustav Sule memorial competition in Tartu. He then threw 88.73 m on 5 June 2018 at Paavo Nurmi Games. On 13 July 2018 he further improved at the IAAF Diamond League meeting in Rabat, taking the national record and meeting record to 89.75 m. 
In August, he won bronze at the 2018 European Athletics Championships with a throw of 85.96 m. He threw first time over 90 meters on 20 June 2019 at the Golden Spike in Ostrava with 90.34 m, which he improved two days later in Kuortane to 90.61 m. At the 2019 World Athletics Championships he won silver with a throw of 86.21 m, but during his fourth throw he injured his shoulder.

International competitions

Seasonal bests by year

2009 – 72.97
2010 – 71.41
2011 – 70.07
2012 – 76.97
2013 – 79.82
2014 – 79.70
2015 – 86.65
2016 – 84.47
2017 – 86.06
2018 – 89.75
2019 – 90.61

References

External links

Estonian male javelin throwers
Living people
1990 births
World Athletics Championships athletes for Estonia
World Athletics Championships medalists
Athletes (track and field) at the 2016 Summer Olympics
Olympic athletes of Estonia
People from Tõrva
Diamond League winners
Competitors at the 2013 Summer Universiade
Competitors at the 2015 Summer Universiade